Mike Long is an American businessman, former CEO of several public companies. He served as the president and chief executive officer of Continuum, an Austin, Texas IT consulting company, from 1991 to 1997.  In 1997, Long was named CEO of Healtheon Corporation (now WebMD), succeeding former CEO David Schnell.  Long oversaw Healtheon's initial public offering. In 2002, Long was recruited to fix the financial struggles of Move, Inc.

Continuum (1983-1997)
Long first gained executive experience at Continuum, a "producer of packaged back-office software for insurance companies." He first served as a director, then moved on to become CEO. In order to gain a foothold in the American insurance market, Long focused Continuum on foreign markets.

WebMD (1997-2001)
After leaving Continuum, Long served for four years as the CEO of WebMD. Long sought to bring to fruition the "dream" of WebMD serving as a network that would link "patients, hospitals, doctors, insurance companies, and pharmacies that would help manage people's health care throughout their lives." Long envisioned cutting $300 billion in waste from the healthcare industry, but what Long "saw as waste others saw as income." WebMD would meet a lot of resistance from the health care industry, never able to fulfil the vision Long had set out for it. WebMD exists now as an easily accessible encyclopedia of health-related information.

Homestore.com > Move, Inc. (2002-2008)
After his time at WebMD, Long envisioned spending more time with his family. In late 2001 Long was approached with an offer of heading up Homestore.com, a company that had been dealing with accounting difficulties and had seen its stock price tumble. The company had only $40 million on hand, yet was spending $50 million a quarter. To aid in the task of restructuring Homestore, Long would bring with him executives from WebMD and Continuum to serve as chief financial officer and chief operating officer. With morale at Homestore sinking and other companies luring away top talent, Long acted swiftly to halt the losses. On his first day as CEO, Long spoke before 700 Homestore employees in the parking lot outside the company's California headquarters. He spoke candidly about the difficulties the company had endured, and those that were to come. He asked the employees to work with him to reinvigorate the company. Long began his restructuring of Homestore by shedding some of its acquisitions and renegotiating contracts with AOL and Cendant. With the flexibility of the renegotiated contract terms, Long was able to assemble a group of investors that would steer the company toward profitability, instead of bankruptcy. With Homestore on track, Long decided a re-branding was necessary as the name "Homestore.com" had become "associated with fraud and a plummeting stock." Re-branded as Move, Inc., the company would continue to gain more investors and increase its valuation from $19 million to $787 million.

Sulgrave Partners LLC (2009 to present)
In late March 2009,  along with Taylor Griffin and Jack Dennison, Long launched Sulgrave Partners LLC, a business advisory–consulting firm headquartered in Washington, D.C. He is also chairman of NEOS Geosolutions, a privately held geosciences technology company, and chairman of Essence Group Holdings Corporation (EGHC), a privately held managed care and healthcare information technology business that develops and markets tools and technology supportive of more accountable, patient-centered healthcare.

References 

American technology chief executives
Living people
Year of birth missing (living people)